Carnacon or Carrownacon is a village, townland and area in central County Mayo, Ireland.

Village
Carnacon is situated on the shores of a mayfly fishing lake, Lough Carra. Around the village are a number of stately homes, ringforts, and historical and archaeological sites. These include the Doon archaeological peninsula and a number of ring forts.  The village has a parish church, national school, community centre, grocery store and two pubs. Carnacon Ladies GAA Football team represents the area.

History
Moore Hall was built by George Moore between 1792 and 1795. It was home to George Moore, novelist, and John Moore, who was President of the short-lived Republic of Connacht. The Moore family won the Chester Cup in England in 1846, with a horse called Coranna.  The horse was trained locally and the winnings went towards assisting the local community during the famine. The house was burnt down in the 1920s by the Irish Republican Army; its remains are still somewhat intact.

Towerhill House was home to the Blake family, who were a landlord family in the west. The Mayo flag originated on this estate in 1885. Clooneen Mill is present on the grounds of Towerhill. Towerhill was sold in the late 1940s and the Land Commission divided the estate between local farmers. Anything of use was taken from the house. Its roof was removed and the house was abandoned. Its remains are still somewhat intact.

Carnacon House, built in 1740, was the home of General James McDonnell, a leader in the rising of 1798. It is the only remaining significant home not abandoned and has been owned by a local family since the 1950s.

Burriscarra Abbey was founded in 1298 by Adam Staunton for the White Friar of Carmelite Brothers.

Environment
Farming is the main activity in the area. The local environment aids a long grass-growing season. The area extends over approximately 7,166 acres. 741 acres of this is woodland, owned and managed by Coillte.

Other natural features include Kiltoom Woods, Lough Carra and the area's horseshoe bats.

Heritage sites
Local heritage sites include Burriscarra Abbey, Moore Hall, Cloneen Mill, a mass rock and several ringforts.

People
Cora Staunton, ladies Gaelic footballer.
George Henry Moore, statesman, provider of famine relief.
George Augustus Moore, Irish novelist and part of the Irish Literary Revival.
John Moore, statesman, 1798 rebel leader and former President of Connacht.
Maurice George Moore, soldier, author, politician and a senator in the Seanad.
Aoibhinn Ní Shúilleabháin, academic, musician and broadcaster.

Gallery

References

External links
Lough Carra Information Website
History of Moore Hall Website

Towns and villages in County Mayo
Townlands of County Mayo